The following is a list of international prime ministerial trips made by Nikol Pashinyan since he became the Prime Minister of Armenia on May 8, 2018.

Summary

2018

2019

2020

2021

2022

2023

Visits to the Republic of Artsakh

Future visits

References

External links

 Official Website – by Prime Minister of Armenia
 Official Website – by Ministry of Foreign Affairs (Armenia)

State visits by Armenian leaders
Armenia, Pashinyan prime ministerial trips
Armenia, Pashinyan prime ministerial trips
Nikol Pashinyan
Diplomatic visits by heads of government
21st century in international relations